Silver State Flour Mill, consisting of two buildings, is located in Paradise Valley, Nevada.

History 
The mill was built in 1864.

The building was listed on the National Register of Historic Places on May 13, 1976.

References 

Flour mills in the United States
Buildings and structures in Humboldt County, Nevada
Industrial buildings completed in 1864
Agricultural buildings and structures on the National Register of Historic Places in Nevada
National Register of Historic Places in Humboldt County, Nevada
1864 establishments in Nevada
Grinding mills in Nevada
Grinding mills on the National Register of Historic Places